David Rupel is an American television soap opera script writer. Rupel is a graduate of Indiana University, with a BA in communications, where he graduated magna cum laude.

Positions held
General Hospital
 Script Writer: January 6, 2016 - July 12, 2017
 Breakdown Writer: March 12, 2012 - April 27, 2012
 Associate Head Writer: 1999 - 2001

Guiding Light
 Writer: July 24, 2007 - February 29, 2008; April 14, 2008 - September 18, 2009
 Associate Head Writer: August 11, 2006 - July 23, 2007
 Script Writer: 2002

Homicide: Life on the Street
Writer

In the Heat of the Night
Writer

Moloney
Writer

The Young and the Restless
 Breakdown Writer: January 25, 2018 – Present

Producer on Meet My Folks, American Princess, The Real Housewives of Orange County, The Real World, Big Brother 2 and Temptation Island.

Awards and nominations
Daytime Emmy Award
Win, 2007, Best Writing, Guiding Light
Nomination, 2003, Best Writing, Guiding Light
Nomination, 2000, Best Writing, General Hospital

Writers Guild of America Award
Nomination, 2002 & 2006, Best Writing, Guiding Light

People's Choice Awards – Best Reality Series – Temptation Island – 2000

External links

American soap opera writers
American male television writers
Year of birth missing (living people)
Living people
Indiana University alumni